Millpu (Quechua for "throat, gullet", also spelled Millpo) is a mountain in the Andes of Peru, about  high. It is located in the Lima Region, Huarochiri Province, in the districts of Carampoma and Chicla. Millpu lies northeast of Wachwa (Quechua for "Andean goose", also spelled Huachhua) and southeast of a lake named Wachwaqucha (Quechua for "Andean goose lake", also spelled Huachuguacocha).

References

Mountains of Peru
Mountains of Lima Region